Christoph Waltz (born 4 October 1956) is an Austrian-German actor. He is known for playing villainous and supporting roles in English-speaking films since 2009; he has been primarily active in the United States. His accolades include two Academy Awards, two Golden Globe Awards, two BAFTA Awards and two Screen Actors Guild Awards.

Waltz's American breakthrough role came in Quentin Tarantino's 2009 film Inglourious Basterds, in which he played SS officer Hans Landa. He collaborated with Tarantino again in 2012, when he played bounty hunter Dr. King Schultz in Django Unchained. For each performance, he earned an Academy Award, BAFTA Award, and Golden Globe Award for Best Supporting Actor. He also received the Best Actor Award at the Cannes Film Festival and a Screen Actors Guild Award for his portrayal of Landa.

Waltz has also starred in Roman Polanski's dark comedy Carnage (2011), Terry Gilliam's science fiction film The Zero Theorem (2013), Tim Burton's biographical film Big Eyes (2014), for which he was nominated for a Golden Globe Award, Alexander Payne's satire Downsizing (2017), as Dr. Dyson Ido in Alita: Battle Angel (2019) Woody Allen's comedy Rifkin's Festival (2020), and Wes Anderson's comedy-drama The French Dispatch (2021). Waltz also gained acclaim for his performance as James Bond's nemesis Ernst Stavro Blofeld in Sam Mendes' Spectre (2015), and Cary Joji Fukunaga's No Time to Die (2021).

In 2020, he starred in the web series Most Dangerous Game, receiving his first Primetime Emmy Award nomination for Outstanding Actor in a Short Form Comedy or Drama Series. He also voiced Mandrake in Epic (2013) and Count Volpe in Guillermo del Toro's Pinocchio adaptation (2022). In 2023, he starred in a dark comedy series The Consultant.

Early life
Waltz was born on 4 October 1956 in Vienna, the son of Johannes Waltz, a German set designer, and Elisabeth Urbancic, an Austrian costume designer of Austrian and Slovenian descent. Waltz comes from a family of theatrical heritage: his maternal grandmother was Burgtheater and silent film actress Maria Mayen, and his step-grandfather, Emmerich Reimers, and his great-grandfather, Georg Reimers, were both stage actors who also appeared in silent films. Waltz's maternal grandfather, Rudolf von Urban, was a psychiatrist of Slovene descent and a student of Sigmund Freud. Waltz's father died when he was seven years old and his mother later married composer and conductor Alexander Steinbrecher. Steinbrecher was previously married to the mother of director Michael Haneke; as a result, Waltz and Haneke shared the same stepfather.

Waltz had a passion for opera as a youth, having seen his first opera (Turandot with Birgit Nilsson in the title role) at around the age of ten. As a teenager, Waltz would visit the opera twice a week. He was uninterested in theatre and wished to become an opera singer. After graduating from Vienna's Theresianum, Waltz went to study acting at the renowned Max Reinhardt Seminar. At the same time, he also studied singing and opera at the University of Music and Performing Arts Vienna, but eventually decided that his voice was not good enough for an opera career. In the late 1970s, Waltz spent some time in New York City where he trained with Lee Strasberg and Stella Adler. He studied script interpretation under Adler and credits his analytical approach to her teaching.

Career

On his return to Europe, Waltz found work as a stage actor, making his debut at the Schauspielhaus in Zurich. He also performed in Vienna, Salzburg, Cologne and Hamburg. He became a prolific television actor in the years 1980 to 2000. In 2000, he made his directorial debut, with the German television production Wenn man sich traut. Before coming to the attention of a larger audience in Tarantino's Inglourious Basterds, he had played Dr. Hans-Joachim Dorfmann in the British TV series The Gravy Train in 1990. The show is a story of intrigue and misdeeds set in the offices of the European Union in Brussels.

In Quentin Tarantino's 2009 film Inglourious Basterds, Waltz portrayed SS-Standartenführer Hans Landa, also known as "The Jew Hunter". Clever, courteous, multilingual—but also self-serving, cunning, implacable and murderous—the character of Landa was such that Tarantino feared he "might have written a part that was un-playable". Waltz received the Best Actor Award for the performance at the 2009 Cannes Film Festival and received acclaim from critics and the public. In 2009, he began sweeping critics' awards circuits, receiving awards for Best Supporting Actor from the New York Film Critics Circle, the Boston Society of Film Critics, Los Angeles Film Critics Association, and for Best Supporting Actor at the 67th Golden Globe Awards and the 16th Screen Actors Guild Awards in January 2010.

The following month, he won the BAFTA for Best Supporting Actor, and won the Academy Award for Best Supporting Actor.  Tarantino acknowledged the importance of Waltz to his film by stating: "I think that Landa is one of the best characters I've ever written and ever will write, and Christoph played it to a tee. It's true that if I couldn't have found someone as good as Christoph I might not have made Inglourious Basterds".

Waltz played gangster Benjamin Chudnofsky in The Green Hornet (2011); that same year, he starred in Water for Elephants and Roman Polanski's Carnage. He played German bounty hunter King Schultz in Quentin Tarantino's Django Unchained (2012), a role Tarantino wrote specifically for Waltz. During a training accident prior to filming, Waltz injured his pelvis. His role garnered him acclaim once again, with Waltz winning the Golden Globe, the BAFTA, and ultimately the Academy Award for Best Supporting Actor.

In April 2013, he was selected as a member of the main competition jury at the 2013 Cannes Film Festival. He directed a production of the opera Der Rosenkavalier at the Vlaamse Opera in Antwerp in late 2013, and in Ghent early 2014. In 2014, he was selected as a member of the jury for the 64th Berlin International Film Festival. He starred as Walter Keane in Tim Burton's Big Eyes, which opened on 25 December 2014, and appeared as Ernst Stavro Blofeld in Spectre, the 24th film in the James Bond franchise. In July 2019, it was reported that Waltz would reprise the role in No Time to Die (2021).

In July 2016, he portrayed lead villain Captain Leon Rom, a corrupt Belgian captain, in The Legend of Tarzan.

In 2017, Waltz appeared in the films Tulip Fever and Downsizing. In 2019, Waltz appeared in the action fantasy Alita: Battle Angel. He directed a production of the opera Falstaff, again at the Vlaamse Opera in Antwerp in late 2017, and in Ghent in early 2018.

In 2018, Waltz agreed to play the leading role in a film adaptation of the novel The Nazi and the Barber.  He described the main role, that of mass murderer Max Schulz, as a "juicy role".

In 2019, Waltz made his directorial debut  and starred in the crime film Georgetown, in which he portrays a man suspected of murdering the wife he married in order to raise his social status. The film premiered at the 2019 Tribeca Film Festival and was released to cinemas on 14 May 2021.

Filmography 
 
Selected filmography

 Inglourious Basterds (2009) 
 The Green Hornet (2011)
 Water for Elephants (2011)
 Carnage (2011)
 Django Unchained (2012)
 Big Eyes (2014)
 Spectre (2015)
 The Legend of Tarzan  (2016)
 Tulip Fever (2017)
 Downsizing (2017)
 Alita: Battle Angel (2019)
 Georgetown (2019)
 Rifkin's Festival (2020) 
 The French Dispatch (2021)
 No Time to Die (2021)
 Pinocchio (2022)
 Dead for a Dollar (2022)

Personal life

Waltz has four children with his former wife, Jacqueline (née Rauch), a dance therapist originally from New York. The two lived in London and their marriage lasted 17 years. Waltz married his second wife, German costume designer Judith Holste, with whom he has a daughter. They divide their time between Berlin, Vienna and Los Angeles.

Waltz speaks German, English, and French in Django Unchained, and also Italian in Inglourious Basterds. 

Waltz was born in Vienna to a German father who applied for him to become a citizen of Germany after his birth. He received Austrian citizenship in 2010, thus holding citizenships of both Austria and Germany, but considers the debate concerning his citizenship a "legal, citizenship law banality", as he did not care about it at all even though he had not previously been able to vote in Austria's national elections. Asked whether he felt Viennese, he responded: "I was born in Vienna, grew up in Vienna, went to school in Vienna, graduated in Vienna, studied in Vienna, started acting in Vienna – and there would be a few further Viennese links. How much more Austrian do you want it?"

See also
 List of German Academy Award winners and nominees

Notes

References

Audiobooks 
 2007: Robert M. Sapolsky: Mein Leben als Pavian. Random House Audio,

External links

 
 Christoph Waltz interviews on Charlie Rose
Christoph Waltz at the German Dubbing Card Index

1956 births
Living people
20th-century Austrian male actors
20th-century German male actors
21st-century Austrian male actors
21st-century German male actors
Austrian expatriate male actors in the United States
Austrian male film actors
Austrian male television actors
Austrian people of German descent
Austrian people of Slovenian descent
Best Supporting Actor Academy Award winners
Best Supporting Actor BAFTA Award winners
Best Supporting Actor Golden Globe (film) winners
Cannes Film Festival Award for Best Actor winners
European Film Awards winners (people)
German expatriate male actors in the United States
German male film actors
German male television actors
German people of Austrian descent
German people of Slovenian descent
Lee Strasberg Theatre and Film Institute alumni
Male actors from Vienna
Method actors
Naturalised citizens of Austria
Outstanding Performance by a Cast in a Motion Picture Screen Actors Guild Award winners
Outstanding Performance by a Male Actor in a Supporting Role Screen Actors Guild Award winners
Recipients of the Austrian Cross of Honour for Science and Art
Recipients of the Bambi (prize)
Recipients of the Romy (TV award)
University of Music and Performing Arts Vienna alumni